Gross Anatomy is a 1989 American drama film directed by Thom Eberhardt and starring Matthew Modine, Daphne Zuniga, and Christine Lahti. It was released by Touchstone Pictures.

Plot
Joe Slovak is a brilliant first-year medical school student whose nonconformist approach to life is tested when he enrolls in gross anatomy, the toughest course in med school. His schoolfriends and lab partners include Kim, a pregnant woman; Miles, a buttoned-down blue-blood; Laurie, an overly ambitious student determined to make it; and David, an over analyzer who is also his roommate. 

Joe's freewheeling, independent style creates funny moments in the classroom, but puts him at odds with the demanding department head, Dr. Woodruff, who questions whether her easygoing "class rebel" has what it takes to be a doctor. 

Meanwhile, Joe falls in love with his lab partner Laurie, who won't let anything, especially romance, interfere with her plans. While Joe's never done anything by the book, he proves he does have what it takes to succeed — without changing his ways. However, Joe's ways and the ways of medicine come to a head twice, once when he discovers David has been taking amphetamines, which leads to his expulsion when he passed out in class and Joe reveals this to Dr. Woodruff. The other time is when Joe is ordered to do an extra credit assignment by Dr. Woodruff involving a complex diagnosis. Joe correctly diagnoses it as a serious, difficult-to-treat chronic illness and learns the patient is Dr. Woodruff herself. 

Joe returns to class and his teammates help him get caught up with his studies. Kim goes into labor when the group is on the road, forcing them to deliver the baby in a truck stop. Joe takes the final exam, then is told that Dr. Woodruff died that morning. This renews Joe's dedication to learning medicine and he takes his studies and his future more seriously. He and Laurie successfully pass their first year of medical school and Kim vows to return. Although Miles ends up with lower grades than Laurie and Joe, he has also passed.

Cast
 Matthew Modine as Joe Slovak
 Daphne Zuniga as Laurie Rorbach
 Christine Lahti as Dr. Rachel Woodruff
 Todd Field as David Schreiner
 John Scott Clough as Miles Reed
 Alice Carter as Kim McCauley
 Robert Desiderio as Dr. Banks
 Zakes Mokae as Dr. Banumbra
 Ryan Cash as Frankie Slovak

Reception
Gross Anatomy was released domestically on October 20, 1989, earning $2,830,387 in 853 theaters during its opening weekend. After its theatrical run, the film brought in a total of $11,604,598 at the domestic box office.

Upon its initial release, the film received mixed to negative critical response. Roger Ebert of the Chicago Sun-Times gave the film a three-star review stating, "Most of the major events in the movie can be anticipated, but they are played with a genuine grace." Janet Maslin of The New York Times also gave the film a positive review, describing the film as "mostly funny and engaging." It holds a rating of 36% on Rotten Tomatoes based on 11 reviews.

References

External links

1989 films
American drama films
1989 drama films
Medical-themed films
Touchstone Pictures films
Films directed by Thom Eberhardt
Films scored by David Newman
Films produced by Debra Hill
Films set in universities and colleges
1980s English-language films
1980s American films